Sawdust is the material composed of fine particles of wood.

Sawdust may also refer to:
Sawdust (album), a 2007 album by the Killers
Sawdust Hughes or Hugh "Sawdust" Hughes, Welsh rugby player

Places
In the United States
 Sawdust, Georgia, unincorporated community
 Sawdust, Tennessee, unincorporated community

See also 
 Sawdust brandy, a type of alcohol made from wood products
 Serradura ("sawdust"), a Portuguese dessert
 Dust (disambiguation)
 
 
 Sawdust Art Festival